Cardiff South  may refer to:

Australia
Cardiff South, New South Wales, a suburb of the City of Lake Macquarie, Australia
South Cardiff FC, a soccer club based in Cardiff South, Newcastle, Australia

Wales
Cardiff South (UK Parliament constituency), a former borough constituency 
Cardiff South and Penarth (UK Parliament constituency), a constituency created in 1983
Cardiff South and Penarth (Senedd constituency), a constituency created in 1999
South (Cardiff electoral ward), a former electoral ward